Leonard Berry may refer to:

 Leonard Berry (professor) (born 1942), American professor of marketing and healthcare